Bistkonj (also Romanized as Bīstkonj; also known as Baskonj and Baskunj) is a village in Shakhen Rural District, in the Central District of Birjand County, South Khorasan Province, Iran. At the 2016 census, its population was 78, in 31 families.

References 

Populated places in Birjand County